An election of the President of the Senate of the Czech Republic was held on 4 December 2002. Petr Pithart was re-elected as the President of the Senate.

Background and voting 
2002 Senate election was won by the Civic Democratic Party. Independent candidates made gains. Candidates of governing coalition were heavily defeated.

Christian and Democratic Union – Czechoslovak People's Party decided to nominate the incumbent President Petr Pithart. He was also supported by the Czech Social Democratic Party, Freedom Union – Democratic Union and Independents. The Civic Democratic Party decided to not support Pithart but also didn't nominate its own candidate.

Election was held on 4 December 2002. Pithart received 50 votes of 81 and was elected.

References

President of the Senate of the Czech Republic election
1996
President of the Senate of the Czech Republic election